Fernando Baeza Meléndez (born January 21, 1942 in Delicias, Chihuahua) is a Mexican politician and a member of the Institutional Revolutionary Party (PRI). Baeza served as the Governor of Chihuahua from 1986 to 1992.

In 1986, was elected Governor of Chihuahua defeating Francisco Barrio National Action Party (PAN) in a controversial gubernatorial election allegedly marred by voting irregularities. (Barrio would later succeed Baeza as governor in 1992).

Governor Baeza signed separate bilateral treaties with Texas Governor Ann Richards and New Mexico Governor Bruce King in June 1991. Under the treaties, Chihuahua agreed to improve free trade, tourism, and economic links between the border states.

References

1942 births
Governors of Chihuahua (state)
Members of the Senate of the Republic (Mexico)
Municipal presidents in Chihuahua (state)
Institutional Revolutionary Party politicians
Living people
20th-century Mexican politicians
People from Delicias, Chihuahua